Canal 9 is a Norwegian television channel owned by TV4 Group and C More Entertainment.

The channel is designed for men and was launched in November 2011.

Programs
List of programs broadcast by Canal 9 Norway

Sports

Football
UEFA Euro 2012
Serie A
UEFA Europa League (From season 2012/13)
Mixed Martial Arts
Ultimate Fighting Championship
The Ultimate Fighter

References

Television channels in Norway
Defunct television channels in Norway
Television channels and stations established in 2011